Governor Davis may refer to:

Adrian Davis (governor), Governor of Montserrat from 2011 to 2015
Cushman Kellogg Davis (1838–1900), Governor of Minnesota
D. W. Davis (1873–1959), Governor of Idaho
Daniel F. Davis (1843–1897), Governor of Maine
Deane C. Davis (1900–1990), Governor of Vermont
Dwight F. Davis (1879–1945), Governor-General of the Philippines
Ed Davis (Royal Marines officer) (born 1963), Governor of Gibraltar since 2016
Edmund J. Davis (1827–1883), Governor of Texas
George Whitefield Davis (1839–1918), Military Governor of Puerto Rico, Military Governor of Panama Canal Zone
Gray Davis (born 1942), Governor of California
Harry L. Davis (1878–1950), Governor of Ohio
Jeff Davis (Arkansas governor) (1862–1913), Governor of Arkansas
Jimmie Davis (1899–2000), Governor of Louisiana
John E. Davis (North Dakota politician) (1913–1990), Governor of North Dakota
John Francis Davis (1795–1890), 2nd Governor of Hong Kong from 1844 to 1848
John W. Davis (governor) (1826–1907), Governor of Rhode Island
John Wesley Davis (1799–1859), 4th Governor of Oregon Territory
John Davis (Massachusetts governor) (1787–1854), Governor of Massachusetts
Jonathan M. Davis (1871–1943), Governor of Kansas
Westmoreland Davis (1859–1942), Governor of Virginia

See also
Jehu Davis (1738–1802), President of Delaware
Myrick Davies (died 1781), Governor of Georgia